Roland Dedius Stănescu (19 April 1990 – 2 July 2022) was a Romanian footballer who played as a midfielder. He played mostly in the Liga II for Dacia Unirea Braila, CS Balotești, CS Minerul Motru and FC Argeș Pitești, Liga III for SC Juventus București.

Stănescu died by suicide on 2 July 2022, jumping from the fourth floor of an apartment building.

References 

1990 births
2022 deaths
2022 suicides
Suicides by jumping in Romania
Romanian footballers
Association football midfielders